Richardson Brognard Okie Jr. (1875-1945) was an American architect.  He is noted for his Colonial-Revival houses and his sensitive restorations of historic buildings.

Biography
Okie was born in Camden, New Jersey, to Dr. Richardson B. and Clara Mickle Okie.  He grew up in Chester County, Pennsylvania, graduated from the architecture program at the University of Pennsylvania in 1897, and briefly studied in Europe.  He gained practical experience from a summer (1896) spent with William L. Price. After college he was employed by Arthur S. Cochran and soon became his associate.  In 1899, he formed a partnership with architects H. Louis Duhring Jr. and Carl Ziegler, that lasted until 1918. He practiced independently until his death in 1945. In his later years he was joined by his son Charles (b. 1915).

He designed a re-creation of George Washington's "President's House" as an attraction at the 1926 Sesquicentennial Exposition in Philadelphia; a re-creation of Pennsbury Manor, William Penn's manor house on the Delaware River, as a museum for the Commonwealth of Pennsylvania; and restored the Betsy Ross House in Philadelphia as a museum. He also designed dozens of exquisitely-detailed Colonial-Revival houses in the suburbs surrounding Philadelphia. He bought his own house, "Hillside" in Radnor, Pennsylvania, in 1901, and tinkered with it periodically. It remains in his family's possession.

A number of his works are listed on the U.S. National Register of Historic Places. Okie's papers are held by the Pennsylvania Historical and Museum Commission in Harrisburg, Pennsylvania.

Selected works

Alterations to Bolingbroke Mansion, King of Prussia Road, Radnor, Pennsylvania (1901 and 1908). Now the rectory of St. Martin's Episcopal Church.
Overfields (Joseph W. Sharp, Jr., house), Sugartown Road, Berwyn, Pennsylvania (1902).
Addition to Pine Forge Mansion, Pine Forge Road and Douglass Drive, Pine Forge, Douglass Township, Berks County, Pennsylvania (1919), NRHP-listed.
Appleford, 770 Mount Moro Road, Villanova, Pennsylvania (1920s).
Re-creation of The President's House, Sesquicentennial Fairgrounds, Philadelphia (1925–26, demolished). Headquarters for the Daughters of the American Revolution during the 1926 World's Fair.
Squirrel Run (S. Hallock duPont residence), 9 Barley Mill Road, Wilmington, Delaware (1926–27).
Restoration of Roughwood, 107 Old Lancaster Road, Devon, Pennsylvania (1928–30), NRHP-listed.
Additions to Hillside, King of Prussia Road, Radnor, Pennsylvania (1929). Okie's own house.
Restoration of Paxton Church, Sharon Street, Paxtang, Pennsylvania (1930).
Library addition to Buena Vista, 661 South Dupont Highway, Saint Georges, Delaware (1932), NRHP-listed.
Alterations to Mansion House, Reading Furnace Historic District, Mansion Rd., Warwick Township, Pennsylvania (1936), NRHP-listed.
Re-creation of Pennsbury Manor, Falls Township, Bucks County, Pennsylvania (1936–39), NRHP-listed. 
Restoration of Betsy Ross House, 239 Arch Street, Philadelphia (1937–41).
Commissioned to design the Hopeman Estate Home in Waynesboro, Virginia for Mr. A.A. Hopeman Jr. 
Additions to South Brook Farm, Street and Bird Roads, East Marlborough Township, Chester County, Pennsylvania (1940), NRHP-listed. Now the New Bolton Center of the University of Pennsylvania School of Veterinary Medicine.
Restoration of St. Peter's Church in the Great Valley, St. Peter's Road, East Whiteland Township, Chester County, Pennsylvania (1940s), NRHP-listed.
Merestone, Yeatman's Station Rd., New Garden Township, Chester County, Pennsylvania (1942), NRHP-listed. The 3-acre property straddles the border between Pennsylvania and Delaware. 
White Horse Historic District, Goshen and Providence Roads, Willistown Township, Pennsylvania, NRHP-listed.
Addition to Abraham Hall House, 7005 Goshen Road (1930s). A later addition is attributed to Charles Okie.
Restoration of White Horse Inn, 6154 Goshen Road (c. 1940). The stone building was moved about 100-feet back from the highway.
Restoration of Mary Yarnall House, 7002 Goshen Road (1940s). Charles Okie designed the garage, c. 1950.
Restoration of Charles Mendenhall House, 7004 Goshen Road (1940s). Charles Okie designed the garage, c. 1950.
Restoration of Caleb Yarnall House, 7008 Goshen Road (1949). Charles Okie.

Gallery

References

External links
Richardson Brognard Okie from Philadelphia Architects and Buildings.

Further reading
James B. Garrison, Stone Houses: Traditional Homes of R. Brognard Okie, Rizzoli, New York, 2013.  

Architects from Philadelphia
People from Camden, New Jersey
People from Chester County, Pennsylvania
1875 births
1945 deaths
University of Pennsylvania alumni
Defunct architecture firms based in Pennsylvania
Preservationist architects